Jean Boin (15 May 1949 – 25 July 2020) was a French professional football player and coach who played as a defender.

Career
Born in Barlin, Boin played for Lens, Reims, Hazebrouck and Saint-Omer. He then managed Bruay-la-Buissière.

He died on 25 July 2020.

References

1949 births
2020 deaths
French footballers
Association football defenders
RC Lens players
Stade de Reims players
SC Hazebrouck players
US Saint-Omer players
Ligue 1 players
Ligue 2 players
French football managers